Plagyrona is a genus of gastropods belonging to the family Valloniidae.

The species of this genus are found in Southern Europe.

Species:

Plagyrona angusta 
Plagyrona debeauxiana 
Plagyrona placida

References

External links

Gastropods